The white-crowned penduline tit (Remiz coronatus) is a species of bird in the family Remizidae. It is found in Afghanistan, China, India, Kazakhstan, Mongolia, Pakistan, Russia, and Tajikistan.

Its natural habitats are boreal forests and temperate forests.

References

white-crowned penduline tit
Birds of Central Asia
Birds of Mongolia
Birds of Western China
Birds of Central China
white-crowned penduline tit
Taxonomy articles created by Polbot